The 2018–19 South Carolina State Bulldogs basketball team represented South Carolina State University in the 2018–19 NCAA Division I men's basketball season. They played their home games at SHM Memorial Center in Orangeburg, South Carolina, and were led by 6th-year head coach Murray Garvin.

Previous season
The Bulldogs finished the 2017–18 season 10–22, 6–10 in MEAC play to finish in 10th place. They lost to Morgan State in the first round of the MEAC tournament.

Roster

Schedule and results

|-
!colspan=12 style=| Non-Conference Regular season

|-
!colspan=12 style=| MEAC regular season

|-
!colspan=12 style=| MEAC tournament
|-

|-

Source

References

South Carolina State Bulldogs basketball seasons
South Carolina State Bulldogs
South Carolina State Bulldogs basketball team
South Carolina State Bulldogs basketball team